The College of the Immaculate Conception of Concordia commonly known as Concordia College Manila is a private Catholic  basic and higher education institution run by Daughters of Charity of Saint Vincent de Paul in Paco, Manila, in the Philippines. The college was founded in 1868. With enrollment increasing every year, Concordia College prospered towards the end of the nineteenth century.

History

 was established by Doña Margarita Roxas de Ayala by converting her three-and-a-half-hectare villa, the La Concordia Estate in Paco, Manila, into a school. She requested eight nuns from the Daughters of Charity from Spain to come to the Philippines to administer the school. Sixty students enrolled and were taught religion, good manners, reading and writing, simple arithmetic, culture, and arts like sewing, embroidery, cooking, needlecraft and household work. The medium of instruction was Spanish.

In 1868, the school officially adapted a new name, the same year that it became the Central House of the Daughters of Charity in the Philippines.

Significant periods in the development of the Concordia College, such as the Philippine Revolution of 1896 and the American era, brought about education reform.

Etymology

Name
According to the student manual, the name "Concordia" means "in accord with" or "in accordance to the above"

Logo

White Easter Lily
Stands for purity in thought, word, and deed

Letter M and crown
Stands for Mary, a prominent figure in the Catholic religion, who is the patroness of the school. The crown which adorns the top of the letter represents her queenship of heaven.

Twelve stars
The twelve stars which surround symbolize the twelve apostles, which represent the disciples as a whole. "It shows Mary's role in leading people to her son, Jesus"

The colors
Blue and white are the colors which represent Mary. Blue stands for loyalty and white for purity or chastity. Green stands for perpetual growth, symbolizing the school that copes with the best and worst of times.

Notable alumni
Among its well-known former students was Sister Asuncion Ventura-Horcoma Bautista, who was the first Filipino to found an orphanage, the Asilo de Looban. Additionally, there was Maria Paz Mendoza-Guazon, the first Filipino woman doctor, who was also an educator, a writer and a feminist. Although her studies were interrupted by the Revolution, she was able to resume them when she transferred to the American School in 1901.

Other notable students were Saturnina, Soledad, and Olympia Rizal, the sisters of Philippine national hero Jose Rizal.

Gallery

References

External links
La Concordia College, early photo of La Concordia

Educational institutions established in 1868
Education in Paco, Manila
Concordia College
Concordia College
Concordia College
Girls' schools in the Philippines
Women's universities and colleges in the Philippines
Universities and colleges in Manila
1868 establishments in the Spanish Empire